Idaea inquinata, the rusty wave, is a moth of the family Geometridae. It is found in Europe.

The species has a wingspan of 16–19 mm. The length of the forewings is 8–10 mm. The adults fly at night from June to July  in Britain. The species is a rare and introduced species in England and The Netherlands and probably came to these countries with imported dried flowers and herbs.

The flight season refers to the British Isles. This may vary in other parts of the range.

External links

Rusty wave at UK Moths
Fauna Europaea
Lepiforum.de
Vlindernet.nl 

Sterrhini
Moths described in 1763
Moths of Europe
Taxa named by Giovanni Antonio Scopoli